José Ricardo Mannarino (born 5 June 1971), known as Zé Ricardo, is a Brazilian professional football manager and former player. He is the current head coach of J2 League club Shimizu S-Pulse.

Career

Early career
Born in Rio de Janeiro, Zé Ricardo represented São Cristóvão and Olaria as a youth, but retired at early age. He subsequently appeared professionally in futsal, but retired at the age of 25.

In 1992, aged only 21, Zé Ricardo was appointed manager of futsal club Vila Isabel. He subsequently went on to manage Vasco da Gama and Botafogo in the 1990s, and also took charge of adult teams in Italy.

Zé Ricardo arrived at Flamengo in 1998, still in futsal. In 2005, he moved to football, being initially in charge of the youth categories.

In 2008 Zé Ricardo left Fla and was appointed manager of Audax Rio. He returned to the former in 2012, being crowned champions of multiple tournaments with the under-18s and under-20s.

Flamengo
On 26 May 2016, Zé Ricardo was appointed as caretaker of the first team, after Muricy Ramalho resigned due to health problems. His first professional match in charge occurred on 29 May 2016, a 2–1 Série A away win against Ponte Preta.

Zé Ricardo was appointed as permanent first team manager on 14 July 2016. On 6 August of the following year, he was sacked after winning only a single match in eight.

Vasco da Gama
On 22 August 2017, just two weeks after departing Flamengo, Zé Ricardo took charge of fellow state club Vasco da Gama. He took the club to a seventh position in the season, thus qualifying for the 2018 Copa Libertadores.

On 2 June of the following year, Zé Ricardo resigned.

Botafogo
On 4 August 2018, Zé Ricardo was appointed manager of Botafogo still in his native state, in the place of fired Marcos Paquetá. On 12 April 2019, after being knocked out of the year's Copa do Brasil by Série C side Juventude, he was sacked.

Fortaleza
On 12 August 2019, Zé Ricardo replaced Rogério Ceni at the helm of Fortaleza, still in the first division. On 27 September, however, he was relieved from his duties, with Ceni subsequently taking his place.

Internacional
On 21 October 2019, Zé Ricardo was announced as manager of Internacional until the end of the year.

Qatar SC
After leaving Internacional, Zé Ricardo spent a year in Italy studying, and was appointed manager of Qatar SC on 14 June 2021. On 29 September, after only five matches, he was sacked.

Vasco da Gama return
On 4 December 2021, Zé Ricardo returned to Vasco da Gama after being named manager of the club for the 2022 campaign. On 5 June 2022, he resigned.

Managerial statistics

Honours

As manager
Flamengo
Copa São Paulo de Futebol Júnior: 2016
Campeonato Carioca: 2017

Individual
 Campeonato Carioca Manager of the year: 2018

References

External links
 
 

1971 births
Living people
Footballers from Rio de Janeiro (city)
Brazilian footballers
Association football defenders
Brazilian football managers
Campeonato Brasileiro Série A managers
Audax Rio de Janeiro Esporte Clube managers
CR Flamengo managers
CR Vasco da Gama managers
Botafogo de Futebol e Regatas managers
Fortaleza Esporte Clube managers
Sport Club Internacional managers
Qatar Stars League managers
Qatar SC managers
Brazilian expatriate football managers
Brazilian expatriate sportspeople in Qatar
Expatriate football managers in Qatar
J1 League managers
J2 League managers
Shimizu S-Pulse managers